Robert Poston may refer to:

 Robert Lincoln Poston (1891–1924), American journalist and editor
 Robert S. Poston (born 1967), American surgeon